The women's 10 metre platform diving competition at the 2016 Olympic Games in Rio de Janeiro took place on 17 and 18 August at the Maria Lenk Aquatic Center within the Olympic Park.

The competition comprised three rounds:

Preliminary round: All divers perform five dives; the top 18 divers advance to the semi-final.
Semi-final: The 18 divers perform five dives; the scores of the qualifications are erased and the top 12 divers advance to the final.
Final: The 12 divers perform five dives; the semi-final scores are erased and the top three divers win the gold, silver and bronze medals accordingly.

Schedule 
All times are Brasília time (UTC-3)

Results

References

Diving at the 2016 Summer Olympics
2016
Olymp
Women's events at the 2016 Summer Olympics